Ripon Rugby Union Football Club is a rugby union club based in Ripon, Borough of Harrogate, North Yorkshire, England. The club was founded in 1886, just 1200 years after the city of Ripon itself.

The club currently fields four adult teams along with the club's development squad (U17s and U18s). Ripon also possess a thriving junior section which widely regarded as one of the largest in North Yorkshire and welcomes all young players from Under 7 through to Under 16. The First XV play in the Yorkshire 2 league which is the eighth tier of the domestic competition organised and governed by the Rugby Football Union.

Club history
In 2006, the club were awarded the prestigious RFU Seal Of Approval in recognition of the safe and well-structured provision of coaching and care given to their young players. The club were presented the award by England national rugby union team legend Martin Johnson

In April 2012, the club celebrated their 125th anniversary. The festival at Mallorie Park, titled '125 years of Ripon rugby', was attended by several notable ex players including former England international Peter Squires as well as the members of the Wooden Spoon Anti-Assassins Club.

Facilities
The Mallorie Park ground is regularly complimented by visitors as being some of the finest in Yorkshire. The ground are meticulously maintained by a group of willing volunteers who are referred to as "The Friday Gang".

In recent years the field facilities have been developed to meet the new demands of the sport and running multiple teams across several age groups. The club now have three changing rooms (with en-suite shower facilities) providing much needed extra accommodation for match days. The clubhouse has also been extended and refitted with a new function room which is used for local functions and social gatherings.

References

External links
www.riponrugby.org
www.pitchero.com/clubs/riponrufcjuniors

English rugby union teams
Rugby clubs established in 1886
Ripon
Sport in North Yorkshire